Newent Town Association Football Club is a football club based in Newent, Gloucestershire, England. They were established in 1920. The club's nickname is the Daffs.

History

The club was founded in 1920. In the 1972-73 season the club won Division two of the Gloucestershire Northern Senior League.  The 1979-80 season saw the club leave the Gloucestershire Northern Senior league and become a founding member of the Gloucestershire County League. The club remained in the Gloucestershire county league until 1986, and re-joined the Gloucestershire Northern Senior League in 1989.

In the 2017-18 season the club entered a team in Division Two West of the Hellenic Football League in addition to having a first team in the Gloucestershire Northern Senior league. However the club was expelled from the Gloucestershire Northern Senior League as a result of entering a team in the Hellenic league, as it was accused of not fielding its strongest team in the Northern League when fixtures clashed. The club in its debut season won the Division Two West title and so gained promotion to Division One West for the 2018-19 season.

They now ply their trade in Hellenic Football League Division One under Manager Andy Bevan and Ben Stringer

Ground

Newent Town play their games at Wildsmith Meadow, Malswick, Newent, Gloucestershire, GL18 1HE. The ground has one stand with terraced seating.

Honours

League

Hellenic Division Two West:
Winners: 2017-18
Gloucestershire Northern Senior League Division Two:
Winners: 1972-73
North Glos Premier League:
Winners: 2012-13

Cup

Reg Davis Trophy:
Winners (2): 2015, 2016

Records
FA Vase best performance: First Round Proper 2022/23 (3rd round)
Newent Town 1 - 1 Eccleshall. Then 3 - 5 on Penalties
FA Cup best performance: 1st Qualifying Round 2020-21

Records
Top Goal Scorer: Darryl Baylis. 178 goals

References

External links
Official website

Hellenic Football League
Association football clubs established in 1920
1920 establishments in England
Football clubs in England
Football clubs in Gloucestershire
Gloucestershire Northern Senior League
Gloucestershire County Football League
Newent